Yeşilöz is a quarter of the town İnebolu, İnebolu District, Kastamonu Province, Turkey. Its population is 361 (2021).

References

Populated places in İnebolu District